Prokocim Kraków (Kolejowy Klub Sportowy Prokocim Kraków) is a Polish football club based in Bieżanów-Prokocim district of Kraków. They currently play in the Polish regional league, the sixth tier of the Polish football league.

History 

The history of the club dates back to 1921, when Franciszek Międzik and Adolf Furgalski organized a sports club called "Krakus" in the village of Prokocim near Krakow. The first colours of the club were pink shirts with green insets. In 1924 "KS Krakus" merged with "KS Orlątko" under the name "KS Świtezianka". In 1933 "KS Świtezianka", after the merger with "KS Orion", the name was changed to "KS Prokocim". In 1949, by virtue of a political decision of the Central Committee of the PZPR, the organizational system of Polish sport was changed, assigning new names to the existing clubs. And so KS Prokocim became "Kolejarz Prokocim" (EN: Railwayman Prokocim), and as the district's inhabitants mostly worked on the railroad, the name stuck and remained even after 1955 (when most clubs returned to their historical names).

Name chronology:

 1921 - 1924 - Klub Sportowy Krakus
 1924 - 1933 - Klub Sportowy Świtezianka (merger with KS Orlątko)
 1933 - 1949 - Klub Sportowy Prokocim (merger with KS Orion)
 1949 - 1955 - Klub Sportowy Kolejarz-Prokocim
 1955–present - Kolejowy Klub Sportowy Prokocim

Season to season

Sources: 1997/98 - 2000/01; 2001/02 - current season 

12 season in Liga okręgowa
4 season in Liga okręgowa (group: Kraków)
8 season in Liga Okręgowa (group: Kraków II)
10 seasons in Klasa A

Honours
Klasa A (2): 1997/98, 2012/13

Squad

Current coaching staff

Sources:

References

External links 
 

Football clubs in Kraków
Football clubs in Poland
Association football clubs established in 1921
1921 establishments in Poland